State Route 209 (SR 209, OH 209) is an east–west state highway in eastern Ohio, a U.S. state.

Route description

State Route 209 traverses a small portion of northeastern Muskingum County and a good part of the western half of Guernsey County.  No segment of this highway is included within the National Highway System, a network of routes deemed to be most important for the nation's economy, mobility and defense.

History
When it was first designated in 1923, State Route 209 ran along its present alignment from its current western terminus at what was then designated State Route 76 (now State Route 83) north of New Concord to downtown Cambridge.  By 1959, with the transferring of U.S. Route 21 onto a new alignment from Byesville north that passes to the east of Cambridge along what is now the alignment of Interstate 77, State Route 209 was extended southeasterly from Cambridge to its present eastern terminus in Byesville along the former alignment of U.S. Route 21.

Major intersections

References

External links

209
Transportation in Muskingum County, Ohio
Transportation in Guernsey County, Ohio